Final Assault, known as Chamonix Challenge in Europe, originally Bivouac in French, is a mountaineering simulation distributed by Infogrames and Epyx in 1987 for the Amiga, Amstrad CPC, Apple IIgs, Atari ST, Commodore 64, MS-DOS, Thomson and ZX Spectrum. The original release of the game was copy protected.

Gameplay
Gameplay in Final Assault takes place in the Alps. The player selects a trail to take, then packs a rucksack for the climb and sets the departure time and season. On the trail, the player will need to overcome crevasses, ice cliffs, and rock faces – as well as complications such as hunger, exhaustion, thirst, and the cold – through caution, dexterity, and packing and using supplies efficiently. The game allows players to save their progress by packing a Save Game Disk in their rucksack.

Reception
The MS-DOS version of the game was given 4 out of 5 stars by Dragon, who called it "innovating, exciting, and intriguing." The PC version of the game was given a 68% by The Games Machine, who criticized it for being tedious, but felt that "there is a great deal of satisfaction to be gained from conquering a peak." Likewise, the Atari ST and Amstrad CPC versions were given a 75% and 72% by the same magazine, respectively. Happy Magazine gave the Commodore 64 version a Happy Rating of 65, praising the amount of strategy present in the gameplay, but criticizing the limited use of music and sound effects. A more modern review from Jeuxvideo.com of the Amiga and Atari ST versions gave the game a 17/20, calling it extremely difficult and "particularly addictive".

Reviews
Atari ST User - Mar, 1988
Your Sinclair - Feb, 1989
The One - Oct, 1988
Computer and Video Games - Dec, 1988
ACE (Advanced Computer Entertainment) - Dec, 1988
ACE (Advanced Computer Entertainment) - Feb, 1988

References

External links 
Final Assault at MobyGames

Review in Compute!
Review in Antic
Review in Info

1987 video games
Amiga games
Amstrad CPC games
Apple IIGS games
Atari ST games
Commodore 64 games
DOS games
Epyx games
Infogrames games
Single-player video games
U.S. Gold games
Video games developed in France
ZX Spectrum games